The meningeal (recurrent) branch of the mandibular nerve (nervus spinosus) is a branch of the mandibular nerve that supplies the dura mater.

Course
The meningeal branch of the mandibular nerve enters the skull through the foramen spinosum along with the middle meningeal artery.

It divides into two branches, anterior and posterior, which accompany the main divisions of the artery and supply the dura mater:
 The posterior branch also supplies the mucous lining of the mastoid cells.
 The anterior communicates with the meningeal branch of the maxillary nerve.

References

External links
 Overview at tufts.edu
 

Mandibular nerve
Meninges